Niklas Hauptmann (born 27 June 1996) is a German professional footballer who plays as a midfielder for  club Dynamo Dresden.

Career
Hauptmann was born in Cologne.

In May 2018, it was announced Hauptmann would join 1. FC Köln, newly relegated to the 2. Bundesliga, from Dynamo Dresden for the 2018–19 season. He thereby followed in the footsteps of his father Ralf who had played for 1. FC Köln in the 1990s and returned to his place of birth.

In July 2020, it was announced that Hauptmann would spend the 2020–21 season on loan at Holstein Kiel.

On 31 August 2022, Köln announced on their website that Hauptmann would return to Dynamo Dresden and sign a contract with the team until 2024.

Personal life
His father, Ralf, was also a professional footballer and former East German international. His younger brother Marius is also a professional footballer, currently playing for FSV Zwickau.

Career statistics

References

1996 births
Living people
Footballers from Cologne
German footballers
Association football midfielders
Dynamo Dresden players
1. FC Köln players
1. FC Köln II players
Holstein Kiel players
2. Bundesliga players
3. Liga players
Regionalliga players